The 1988 du Maurier Classic was contested from June 30 to July 3 at Vancouver Golf Club in Coquitlam, British Columbia. It was the 16th edition of the du Maurier Classic, and the 10th edition as a major championship on the LPGA Tour.

This event was won by Sally Little.

Final leaderboard

External links
 Golf Observer source

Canadian Women's Open
Sport in Coquitlam
du Maurier Classic
du Maurier Classic
du Maurier Classic
du Maurier Classic
du Maurier Classic